Acrolepiopsis nagaimo is a moth of the family Acrolepiidae. It was described by Yasuda in 2000. It is found in Japan.

The larvae feed on Dioscorea oposita. They mine the leaves of their host plant.

References

Moths described in 2000
Acrolepiidae
Moths of Japan